The Tigres de Aragua is a baseball team that plays in the Venezuelan Professional Baseball League and represents the state of Aragua.

Founded in 1965, the Tigres plays its home games at the Estadio José Pérez Colmenares in Maracay. The team won the Venezuelan National Series Championship for the third time in 2009, by defeating the Leones del Caracas at the UCV Stadium, 7–2, in the seventh game of a best-of-seven series. This championship made it their third in a row and eighth in history, including five of the prior six years.

The Tigres won their first Caribbean World Series title in 2009. Their most recent championship was in the 2015–2016 season, when they defeated Navegantes del Magallanes in six playoff games.

Championship titles/Managers
 –: Rod Carew
 –: Osvaldo Virgil
 1975–: Osvaldo Virgil
 –: Buddy Bailey
 2004–: Buddy Bailey
 –: Buddy Bailey
 2007–: Buddy Bailey
 2008–: Buddy Bailey
 –: Buddy Bailey
 –: Eddie Pérez

Caribbean Series appearances 

 1972
 1975
 1976
 2004
 2005
 2007
 2008
 2009
 2016

Current roster

All-time roster

 Tommie Aaron
 Paul Abbott
 Teolindo Acosta
 Edgardo Alfonzo
 Brant Alyea
 Oscar Azócar
 Brian Bass
 John Bateman
 Yorman Bazardo
 Ronald Belisario
 Dámaso Blanco
 Lyman Bostock
 Bob Brenly
 Bob Burda
 Sal Butera
 Enos Cabell
 Miguel Cabrera
 Bill Campbell
 Rod Carew
 Chico Carrasquel
 Rico Carty
 Pedro Castellano
 Ramón Castro
 Ronny Cedeño
 Raúl Chávez
 David Concepción
 Tim Corcoran
 Jerry Cram
 Steve Crawford
 Darren Daulton
 Víctor Davalillo
 Alex Delgado
 Argenis Díaz
 Rawly Eastwick
 Jim Edmonds
 Dick Egan
 Dave Engle
 Eduardo Escobar
 Horacio Estrada
 Seth Etherton
 Dan Ford
 Ted Ford
 Sam Fuld
 Rich Gale
 Richard Garcés
 Avisail García
 Freddy García
 Rosman García
 Phil Garner
 Adrian Garrett
 Héctor Giménez
 Dan Gladden
 Germán González
 Tom Grieve
 Tim Harikkala
 Roric Harrison
 Leonardo Hernández
 Rich Hill
 Jim Holt
 Tim Hosley
 Dave Hudgens
 Torii Hunter
 Enrique Izquierdo
 Von Joshua
 Joe Kerrigan
 Duane Kuiper
 Bill Landrum
 Jason Lane
 Wilfredo Ledezma
 Steve Luebber
 Mike Lum
 Rick Lysander
 Anderson Machado
 Héctor Maestri
 Luis Maza
 Terry McGriff
 José Mijares
 George Mitterwald
 Víctor Moreno
 Roberto Muñoz
 Graig Nettles
 Ron Oester
 Ray Olmedo
 Paul O'Neill
 Jim Pankovits
 Larry Parrish
 Mike Pazik
 Eddie Pérez
 Yohan Pino
 Leopoldo Posada
 Ted Power
 Juan Carlos Pulido
 Wilson Ramos
 Ken Ray
 Luis Rodríguez
 Juan Rivera
 Cookie Rojas
 Alex Romero
 Pablo Sandoval
 Manny Sarmiento
 Skip Schumaker
 Diego Seguí
 Hernán Silva
 Yangervis Solarte
 Lester Straker
 Rick Sutcliffe
 Mickey Tettleton
 Kevin Tolar
 Tim Tolman
 Gary Ward
 Terry Whitfield
 Milt Wilcox
 Mark Wiley
 Jim Willoughby
 Joel Youngblood
 Pat Zachry
 Eduardo Zambrano

See also
Tigres de Aragua players
 Venezuelan Professional Baseball League

References

External links
 Official site
 Pura Pelota website – Tigres de Aragua (1965–present)

1965 establishments in Venezuela
Baseball teams in Venezuela
Sport in Aragua
Baseball teams established in 1965